AFLP-PCR or just AFLP is a PCR-based tool used in genetics research, DNA fingerprinting, and in the practice of genetic engineering. Developed in the early 1990s by KeyGene, AFLP uses restriction enzymes to digest genomic DNA, followed by ligation of adaptors to the sticky ends of the restriction fragments. A subset of the restriction fragments is then selected to be amplified. This selection is achieved by using primers complementary to the adaptor sequence, the restriction site sequence and a few nucleotides inside the restriction site fragments (as described in detail below). The amplified fragments are separated and visualized on denaturing on agarose gel electrophoresis , either through autoradiography or fluorescence methodologies, or via automated capillary sequencing instruments.

Although AFLP should not be used as an acronym, it is commonly referred to as "Amplified fragment length polymorphism". However, the resulting data are not scored as length polymorphisms, but instead as presence-absence polymorphisms.

AFLP-PCR is a highly sensitive method for detecting polymorphisms in DNA. The technique was originally described by Vos and Zabeau in 1993. In detail, the procedure of this technique is divided into three steps:

Digestion of total cellular DNA with one or more restriction enzymes and ligation of restriction half-site specific adaptors to all restriction fragments.
Selective amplification of some of these fragments with two PCR primers that have corresponding adaptor and restriction site specific sequences.
Electrophoretic separation of amplicons on a gel matrix, followed by visualisation of the band pattern.

Applications

The AFLP technology has the capability to detect various polymorphisms in different genomic regions simultaneously. It is also highly sensitive and reproducible. As a result, AFLP has become widely used for the identification of genetic variation in strains or closely related species of plants, fungi, animals, and bacteria. The AFLP technology has been used in criminal and paternity tests, also to determine slight differences within populations, and in linkage studies to generate maps for quantitative trait locus (QTL) analysis.

There are many advantages to AFLP when compared to other marker technologies including randomly amplified polymorphic DNA (RAPD), restriction fragment length polymorphism (RFLP), and microsatellites. AFLP not only has higher reproducibility, resolution, and sensitivity at the whole genome level compared to other techniques, but it also has the capability to amplify between 50 and 100 fragments at one time. In addition, no prior sequence information is needed for amplification (Meudt & Clarke 2007). As a result, AFLP has become extremely beneficial in the study of taxa including bacteria, fungi, and plants, where much is still unknown about the genomic makeup of various organisms.

The AFLP technology is covered by patents and patent applications of Keygene N.V. AFLP is a registered trademark of Keygene N.V.

References

External links
Software for analyzing AFLP data
BioNumerics One universal platform to manage and analyze all your biological data including AFLP
KeyGene Quantar Suite Versatile marker scoring software
SoftGenetics GeneMarker fragment analysis software

Freeware for analyzing AFLP data
SourceForge Genographer Free software for manual scoring (Java application)
SourceForge RawGeno Free automated scoring (R CRAN environment, including a user-friendly GUI)

Online programs for simulation of AFLP-PCR
ALFIE - BProkaryotes or uploaded sequences
In silico AFLP-PCR for prokaryotes, some eukaryotes or uploaded sequences
Enzymes for AFLP New England Biolabs
 AFLP Technology note at KeyGene
 AFLP Applications

Molecular biology
DNA
DNA profiling techniques